Halictus gemmeus is a species of bee in the family Halictidae, the sweat bees.

Distribution
Halictus gemmeus is a Mediterranean species present in Portugal, Spain, France, Italy, Greece, Turkey, Syria, Algeria, Morocco and western Sahara.

Bibliography
 Pesenko, Y. A. 2004. The phylogeny and classification of the tribe Halictini, with special reference to the Halictus genus-group (Hymenoptera: Halictidae). Zoosystematica Rossica, 13: 83-113.
 Rasmont, P., Ebmer, A.P., Banaszak, J. & van der Zanden, G. 1995. Hymenoptera Apoidea Gallica - Liste taxonomique des abeilles de France, de Suisse et du Grand-Duché de Luxembourg. Bulletin de la Société entomologique de France, 100: 1-98.

References

gemmeus
Insects described in 1872
Hymenoptera of Europe